The Crown 28 is a Canadian sailboat, that was designed by naval architect C. William Lapworth in conjunction with Calgan Marine founder Al Nairne and first built in 1976.

Calgan Marine had produced several Cal Yachts designs under licence and the Crown 28 is a development of the 1974 Cal 2-27.

Production
The boat was built by Calgan Marine in North Vancouver, British Columbia, Canada, but it is now out of production.

Design

The Crown 28 is a small recreational keelboat, built predominantly of fiberglass, with wood trim. It has a masthead sloop rig, inboard engine, an internally-mounted spade-type rudder and a fixed fin keel. It displaces  and carries  of ballast.

See also
List of sailing boat types

Related development
Cal 2-27

Similar sailboats
Aloha 27
Aloha 28
C&C 27
Catalina 27
Catalina 270
Catalina 275 Sport
CS 27
Edel 820
Express 27
Fantasia 27
Halman Horizon
Hotfoot 27
Hullmaster 27
Hunter 27
Hunter 27-2
Hunter 27-3
Island Packet 27
Mirage 27 (Perry)
Mirage 27 (Schmidt)
O'Day 28
O'Day 272
Sabre 28
Tanzer 27
Watkins 27
Watkins 27P

References

External links

Keelboats
1970s sailboat type designs
Sailing yachts
Sailboat type designs by Bill Lapworth
Sailboat types built by Calgan Marine